Baron Lloyd, of Dolobran in the County of Montgomery, was a title in the Peerage of the United Kingdom. It was created in 1925 for the Conservative politician Sir George Lloyd. He was succeeded by his only son, the second Baron. He was also a Conservative politician. He had no surviving male issue and on his death in 1985 the barony became extinct.

Sampson Samuel Lloyd, grandfather of the first Baron, was Member of Parliament for Plymouth and Warwickshire South.

Barons Lloyd (1925)
George Ambrose Lloyd, 1st Baron Lloyd (1879–1941)
Alexander David Frederick Lloyd, 2nd Baron Lloyd (1912–1985)

See also
 Anthony Lloyd, Baron Lloyd of Berwick
 Lloyd family (Birmingham)

References

David Beamish's Peerage Page

 
1925 establishments in the United Kingdom
1985 disestablishments in the United Kingdom
Extinct baronies in the Peerage of the United Kingdom
Noble titles created in 1925
Noble titles created for UK MPs